"We Take Care of Our Own" is a song written and recorded by American musician Bruce Springsteen. It is the first single from his album, Wrecking Ball. The single was released for download through amazon.com and iTunes on  January 18, 2012. The song made its live debut on February 12, 2012, at the 54th Grammy Awards, where it was nominated for Best Rock Performance and Best Rock Song.

Rolling Stone named the song the 32nd best song of 2012. Music critic Robert Christgau named it the best single of 2012.

Lyrics and music
The song is an up-tempo rocker which resembles the sound of the younger bands Springsteen has recently taken under his wing, such as Arcade Fire and The Gaslight Anthem.

The lyrics express Springsteen's frustration that—after several years of economic hard times—people are less willing to help each other. The song begins:
I've been stumblin' on good hearts turned to stoneThe road of good intentions has gone dry as a bone.The narrator asks where he can find merciful hearts or work to set his hands and soul free and makes references to Hurricane Katrina.  However, the refrain strikes a more optimistic (or ironic depending on listener interpretation) note that "Wherever this flag is flown/We take care of our own."

NPR's Ann Powers describes the song as "a bitter anthem" and states that on this song, as with "Born in the U.S.A.," "Glory Days", and 2008's "Girls in Their Summer Clothes," "Springsteen brings out big emotions and then demands we drop the delusions that often accompany them." The New York Times'' printed a letter from a reader who said that the song rebukes the US government inaction regarding Hurricane Katrina disaster relief in New Orleans; that the song's message "is not that Americans take care of one another, but that we should—and don't."

Music videos
Springsteen was spotted in New Jersey on January 13, 2012, filming what was believed to be a new music video. On January 19, 2012, the date the single was released, Springsteen's official website released a music video for the song containing various black and white images of Springsteen interspersed with text of the song's lyrics.

On February 10, 2012, a second official music video premiered, this time featuring Bruce performing in abandoned buildings and on rooftops in an urban setting. Various images of working class Americans are shown as lyrics flash by. As Springsteen sings the song's emotional resolution ("Wherever this flag is flown/We take care of our own"), the image transforms from black and white to color, climaxing as Springsteen joins a crowd of everyday Americans walking together in daylight, in unison.

The video was filmed in and around Asbury Park, including the roof of the Savoy Theatre and inside of Frank's Deli.

Use in politics
This song was played throughout Barack Obama's 2012 presidential campaign and after his victory speech at his headquarters in Chicago. Sales of the song rose 409% following Obama's speech at the Democratic National Convention.

The song was played at Joe Biden's victory speech after he had won the 2020 presidential election.

Personnel
 Bruce Springsteen – lead vocal, guitars, banjo, piano, organ, drums, percussion, loops
 Patti Scialfa – backing vocals
Ron Aniello – guitar, bass, keyboards, piano, drums, loops
Lisa Lowell – backing vocals 
Soozie Tyrell – violin, backing vocals
 New York String Section 
Rob Mathes – orchestration
Sandy Park – string contractor
Lisa Kim – concertmaster
Myumju Lee – violin
Ann Lehmaan – violin
Lizz Lim – violin
Johanna Marher – violin
Annaliesa Place – violin
Fiona Simon – violin
Sharon Yamada – violin
Jung Sun Yu – violin
Karen Dreyfus – viola
Daniel Panner – viola
Robert Rinehart – viola
Mina Smith – cello
Alan Stepansky – cello

Charts

References

External links
 Brucespringsteen.net

2012 songs
Bruce Springsteen songs
Songs written by Bruce Springsteen
Columbia Records singles
2012 singles
Song recordings produced by Ron Aniello
Song recordings produced by Bruce Springsteen